Luisa Laschi, also known as Luisa Laschi-Mombelli, (c. 1760 – c. 1790) was an Italian operatic soprano prominent in the opera houses of Austria and Italy. Amongst the numerous roles she created in her brief but intense career were Countess Almaviva in Mozart's Le nozze di Figaro, Aspasia in Salieri's Axur, re d'Ormus, and Isabella in Martín y Soler's Una cosa rara. Laschi was the first wife of the tenor Domenico Mombelli by whom she had two children, both of whom died in infancy.

References

1760s births
1790s deaths
Italian operatic sopranos
Musicians from Florence
18th-century Italian women opera singers